Maurice Marie Victor Bourguin (10 December 1856 Chateau-Thierry – 19 January 1910) was a French professor of Law.

Bouguin started his career at the University of Douai where he taught administrative law. He moved to the University of Lille

Works
 "Des rapports entre Proudhon et Marx" in Revue d'Economie Politique, Paris, March 1893, Vol. 7, No. 3 pp 177–207
 La mesure de la valeur et la monnaie (1896)
 Les systèmes socialistes et l'évolution économique (1913)

1856 births
1910 deaths